HK2 (Hundred-Kilobyte Kernel) is a light-weight and dynamic dependency injection framework and is a part of the GlassFish Application Server.

HK2 complies with JSR 330 (Dependency Injection for Java). It has useful utilities for marking classes as services and interfaces as contracts.

Some of the features of HK2 DI Kernel are
 Custom scopes
 use of proxies
 Custom injection resolution
 Assisted injection
 J-I-T injection resolution
 Custom validation and security
 Run Level Services

References

Java enterprise platform
Software frameworks